The 1922 United States House of Representatives elections were elections for the United States House of Representatives to elect members to serve in the 68th United States Congress. They were held for the most part on November 7, 1922, while Maine held theirs on September 11. They occurred in the middle of President Warren G. Harding's term. Just as voters had expressed their distrust of Wilson in 1920, now voters had a chance to express the widespread feeling that Congress had failed to address economic problems, especially the brief but sharp economic recession of 1921–1922. Most of the seats that Republicans lost had long been held by Democrats, who now returned with an even stronger base in the major cities.

The Republican Party lost a net of 77 seats to the opposition Democratic Party. The Republicans were neither unified nor well led, and they could boast of very few successes except tax cuts for the wealthy and for corporations, and higher tariffs that pleased manufacturing interest but raised consumer prices.   With Senator Bob La Follette as their unofficial leader, some progressives formed a small but highly vocal group on the left of the Republican Party. Former  Progressives from 1912 who had supported Theodore Roosevelt mostly refused to support LaFollette, who had been a bitter enemy of Roosevelt. Republicans nonetheless retained a narrow majority, although splits in the party made it difficult for Harding to govern. In Minnesota, the Farmer–Labor Party, also gained several seats. The Democrats showed their greatest support in the industrial cities, where the Irish and German element returned to that party. In addition, there was growing support among the more recent immigrants, who had become more Americanized. Many ethnic families now had a veteran in their midst, and paid closer attention to national issues, such as the question of a bonus for veterans. There was also an expression of annoyance with the federal prohibition of beer and wine, and the closing of most saloons.

This was the first election after the completion of the 1920 United States Census. However, the Republican-controlled Congress failed to reapportion the House membership prior to the 1922 election, and therefore the congressional districts remained based on the 1910 Census for another decade. This failure to reapportion may have been politically motivated, as Republicans may have feared the effect such a reapportionment would have on their future electoral prospects.

Overall results

Source: Election Statistics – Office of the Clerk

Special elections 

|-
! 
| Alanson B. Houghton
|  | Republican
| 1918
|  | Incumbent resigned to become United States Ambassador to Germany.New member elected April 11, 1922.New member elected.Republican hold.
| nowrap | 

|-
! 
| William E. Mason
| | Republican
| 1916
|  | Incumbent died June 16, 1921.New member elected November 7, 1922 to finish her father's term.Republican hold.Successor was not elected to the next term.
| nowrap | 

|-
! 
| Joseph Walsh
| | Republican
| 1914
| | Incumbent resigned to become Justice of the Massachusetts Superior Court.elected  November 7, 1922.Republican hold.Winner was also elected to the next term, see below.
| nowrap | 

|-
! 
| C. Frank Reavis
| | Republican
| 1914
| | Incumbent resigned to special assistant to the U.S. Attorney General.elected  November 7, 1922.Republican hold.Winner not a candidate for the next term.
| nowrap | 

|-
! 

|-
! 

|-
! 

|}

Alabama

|-
! 
| John McDuffie
| | Democratic
| 1918
| Incumbent re-elected.
| nowrap | 

|-
! 
| John R. Tyson
| | Democratic
| 1920
| Incumbent re-elected.
| nowrap | 

|-
! 
| Henry B. Steagall
| | Democratic
| 1914
| Incumbent re-elected.
| nowrap | 

|-
! 
| Lamar Jeffers
| | Democratic
| 1921 
| Incumbent re-elected.
| nowrap | 

|-
! 
| William B. Bowling
| | Democratic
| 1920
| Incumbent re-elected.
| nowrap | 

|-
! 
| William B. Oliver
| | Democratic
| 1914
| Incumbent re-elected.
| nowrap | 

|-
! 
| Lilius Bratton Rainey
| | Democratic
| 1918
| | Incumbent retired.New member elected.Democratic hold.
| nowrap | 

|-
! 
| Edward B. Almon
| | Democratic
| 1914
| Incumbent re-elected.
| nowrap | 

|-
! 
| George Huddleston
| | Democratic
| 1914
| Incumbent re-elected.
| nowrap | 

|-
! 
| William B. Bankhead
| | Democratic
| 1916
| Incumbent re-elected.
| nowrap | 

|}

Arizona

|-
! 
| Carl Hayden
| | Democratic
| 1912 
| Incumbent re-elected.
| nowrap | 

|}

Arkansas

|-
! 
| William J. Driver
| | Democratic
| 1920
| Incumbent re-elected.
| nowrap | 

|-
! 
| William A. Oldfield
| | Democratic
| 1908
| Incumbent re-elected.
| nowrap | 

|-
! 
| John N. Tillman
| | Democratic
| 1914
| Incumbent re-elected.
| nowrap | 

|-
! 
| Otis Wingo
| | Democratic
| 1912
| Incumbent re-elected.
| nowrap | 

|-
! 
| Henderson M. Jacoway
| | Democratic
| 1910
| | Incumbent retired.New member elected.Democratic hold.
| nowrap | 

|-
! 
| Chester W. Taylor
| | Democratic
| 1921 
| | Incumbent retired.New member elected.Democratic hold.
| nowrap | 

|-
! 
| Tilman B. Parks
| | Democratic
| 1920
| Incumbent re-elected.
| nowrap | 

|}

California

|-
! 
| Clarence F. Lea
|  | Democratic
| 1916
| Incumbent re-elected.
| nowrap | 

|-
! 
| John E. Raker
|  | Democratic
| 1910
| Incumbent re-elected.
| nowrap | 

|-
! 
| Charles F. Curry
|  | Republican
| 1912
| Incumbent re-elected.
| nowrap | 

|-
! 
| Julius Kahn
|  | Republican
| 1898
| Incumbent re-elected.
| nowrap | 

|-
! 
| John I. Nolan
|  | Republican
| 1912
| Incumbent re-elected.
| nowrap | 

|-
! 
| James H. MacLafferty
|  | Republican
| 1922
| Incumbent re-elected.
| nowrap | 

|-
! 
| Henry E. Barbour
|  | Republican
| 1918
| Incumbent re-elected.
| nowrap | 

|-
! 
| Arthur M. Free
|  | Republican
| 1920
| Incumbent re-elected.
| nowrap | 

|-
! 
| Walter F. Lineberger
|  | Republican
| 1920
| Incumbent re-elected.
| nowrap | 

|-
! 
| Henry Z. Osborne
|  | Republican
| 1916
| Incumbent re-elected.Incumbent died February 8, 1923, before the new Congress, leading to a special election.
| nowrap | 

|-
! 
| Phil Swing
|  | Republican
| 1920
| Incumbent re-elected.
| nowrap | 

|}

Colorado

|-
! 
| William Newell Vaile
| | Republican
| 1918
| Incumbent re-elected.
| nowrap | 

|-
! 
| Charles Bateman Timberlake
| | Republican
| 1914
| Incumbent re-elected.
| nowrap | 

|-
! 
| Guy Urban Hardy
| | Republican
| 1918
| Incumbent re-elected.
| nowrap | 

|-
! 
| Edward Thomas Taylor
| | Democratic
| 1908
| Incumbent re-elected.
| nowrap | 

|}

Connecticut

|-
! 
| E. Hart Fenn
| | Republican
| 1920
| Incumbent re-elected.
| nowrap | 

|-
! 
| Richard P. Freeman
| | Republican
| 1914
| Incumbent re-elected.
| nowrap | 

|-
! 
| John Q. Tilson
| | Republican
| 1914
| Incumbent re-elected.
| nowrap | 

|-
! 
| Schuyler Merritt
| | Republican
| 1916
| Incumbent re-elected.
| nowrap | 

|-
! 
| James P. Glynn
| | Republican
| 1914
| | Incumbent lost re-election.New member elected.Democratic gain.
| nowrap | 

|}

Delaware

|-
! 
| Caleb R. Layton
| | Republican
| 1918
| | Incumbent lost re-election.New member elected.Democratic gain.
| nowrap | 

|}

Florida

|-
! 
| Herbert J. Drane
| | Democratic
| 1916
| Incumbent re-elected.
| nowrap | 

|-
! 
| Frank Clark
| | Democratic
| 1904
| Incumbent re-elected.
| nowrap | 

|-
! 
| John H. Smithwick
| | Democratic
| 1918
| Incumbent re-elected.
| nowrap | 

|-
! 
| William J. Sears
| | Democratic
| 1914
| Incumbent re-elected.
| nowrap | 

|}

Georgia

|-
! 
| James W. Overstreet
| | Democratic
| 1916
| | Incumbent lost renomination.New member elected.Democratic hold.
| nowrap | 

|-
! 
| Frank Park
| | Democratic
| 1912
| Incumbent re-elected.
| nowrap | 

|-
! 
| Charles R. Crisp
| | Democratic
| 1912
| Incumbent re-elected.
| nowrap | 

|-
! 
| William C. Wright
| | Democratic
| 1918
| Incumbent re-elected.
| nowrap | 

|-
! 
| William D. Upshaw
| | Democratic
| 1918
| Incumbent re-elected.
| nowrap | 

|-
! 
| James W. Wise
| | Democratic
| 1914
| Incumbent re-elected.
| nowrap | 

|-
! 
| Gordon Lee
| | Democratic
| 1904
| Incumbent re-elected.
| nowrap | 

|-
! 
| Charles H. Brand
| | Democratic
| 1916
| Incumbent re-elected.
| nowrap | 

|-
! 
| Thomas Montgomery Bell
| | Democratic
| 1904
| Incumbent re-elected.
| nowrap | 

|-
! 
| Carl Vinson
| | Democratic
| 1914
| Incumbent re-elected.
| nowrap | 

|-
! 
| William C. Lankford
| | Democratic
| 1918
| Incumbent re-elected.
| nowrap | 

|-
! 
| William W. Larsen
| | Democratic
| 1916
| Incumbent re-elected.
| nowrap | 

|}

Idaho

|-
! 
| Burton L. French
| | Republican
| 1916
| Incumbent re-elected.
| nowrap | 

|-
! 
| Addison T. Smith
| | Republican
| 1912
| Incumbent re-elected.
| nowrap | 

|}

Illinois

|-
! 
| Martin B. Madden
| | Republican
| 1904
| Incumbent re-elected.
| nowrap | 

|-
! 
| James R. Mann
| | Republican
| 1896
| Incumbent re-elected.
| nowrap | 

|-
! 
| Elliott W. Sproul
| | Republican
| 1920
| Incumbent re-elected.
| nowrap | 

|-
! 
| John W. Rainey
| | Democratic
| 1918
| Incumbent re-elected.
| nowrap | 

|-
! 
| Adolph J. Sabath
| | Democratic
| 1906
| Incumbent re-elected.
| nowrap | 

|-
! 
| John J. Gorman
| | Republican
| 1920
| | Incumbent lost re-election.New member elected.Democratic gain.
| nowrap | 

|-
! 
| M. Alfred Michaelson
| | Republican
| 1920
| Incumbent re-elected.
| nowrap | 

|-
! 
| Stanley H. Kunz
| | Democratic
| 1920
| Incumbent re-elected.
| nowrap | 

|-
! 
| Frederick A. Britten
| | Republican
| 1912
| Incumbent re-elected.
| nowrap | 

|-
! 
| Carl R. Chindblom
| | Republican
| 1918
| Incumbent re-elected.
| nowrap | 

|-
! 
| Ira C. Copley
| | Republican
| 1910
| | Incumbent retired.New member elected.Republican hold.
| nowrap | 

|-
! 
| Charles Eugene Fuller
| | Republican
| 1914
| Incumbent re-elected.
| nowrap | 

|-
! 
| John C. McKenzie
| | Republican
| 1910
| Incumbent re-elected.
| nowrap | 

|-
! 
| William J. Graham
| | Republican
| 1916
| Incumbent re-elected.
| nowrap | 

|-
! 
| Edward John King
| | Republican
| 1914
| Incumbent re-elected.
| nowrap | 

|-
! 
| Clifford C. Ireland
| | Republican
| 1916
| | Incumbent lost renomination.New member elected.Republican hold.
| nowrap | 

|-
! 
| Frank H. Funk
| | Republican
| 1920
| Incumbent re-elected.
| nowrap | 

|-
! 
| Joseph Gurney Cannon
| | Republican
| 1914
| | Incumbent retired.New member elected.Republican hold.
| nowrap | 

|-
! 
| Allen F. Moore
| | Republican
| 1920
| Incumbent re-elected.
| nowrap | 

|-
! 
| Guy L. Shaw
| | Republican
| 1920
| | Incumbent lost re-election.New member elected.Democratic gain.
| nowrap | 

|-
! 
| Loren E. Wheeler
| | Republican
| 1914
| | Incumbent lost re-election.New member elected.Democratic gain.
| nowrap | 

|-
! 
| William A. Rodenberg
| | Republican
| 1914
| | Incumbent retired.New member elected.Republican hold.
| nowrap | 

|-
! 
| Edwin B. Brooks
| | Republican
| 1918
| | Incumbent lost re-election.New member elected.Democratic gain.
| nowrap | 

|-
! 
| Thomas Sutler Williams
| | Republican
| 1914
| Incumbent re-elected.
| nowrap | 

|-
! 
| Edward E. Denison
| | Republican
| 1914
| Incumbent re-elected.
| nowrap | 

|-
! 
| Richard Yates Jr.
| | Republican
| 1918
| Incumbent re-elected.
| rowspan=2 nowrap | 

|- 
! 
| Winnifred S. M. Huck
| | Republican
| 1922 
| | Incumbent lost renomination.New member elected.Republican hold.

|}

Indiana

|-
! 
| Oscar R. Luhring
| | Republican
| 1918
| | Incumbent lost re-election.New member elected.Democratic gain.
| nowrap | 

|-
! 
| Oscar E. Bland
| | Republican
| 1916
| | Incumbent lost re-election.New member elected.Democratic gain.
| nowrap | 

|-
! 
| James W. Dunbar
| | Republican
| 1918
| | Incumbent retired.New member elected.Democratic gain.
| nowrap | 

|-
! 
| John S. Benham
| | Republican
| 1918
| | Incumbent lost re-election.New member elected.Democratic gain.
| nowrap | 

|-
! 
| Everett Sanders
| | Republican
| 1916
| Incumbent re-elected.
| nowrap | 

|-
! 
| Richard N. Elliott
| | Republican
| 1918
| Incumbent re-elected.
| nowrap | 

|-
! 
| Merrill Moores
| | Republican
| 1914
| Incumbent re-elected.
| nowrap | 

|-
! 
| Albert H. Vestal
| | Republican
| 1916
| Incumbent re-elected.
| nowrap | 

|-
! 
| Fred S. Purnell
| | Republican
| 1916
| Incumbent re-elected.
| nowrap | 

|-
! 
| William R. Wood
| | Republican
| 1914
| Incumbent re-elected.
| nowrap | 

|-
! 
| Milton Kraus
| | Republican
| 1916
| | Incumbent lost re-election.New member elected.Democratic gain.
| nowrap | 

|-
! 
| Louis W. Fairfield
| | Republican
| 1916
| Incumbent re-elected.
| nowrap | 

|-
! 
| Andrew J. Hickey
| | Republican
| 1918
| Incumbent re-elected.
| nowrap | 

|}

Iowa

|-
! 
| William F. Kopp
| | Republican
| 1920
| Incumbent re-elected.
| nowrap | 

|-
! 
| Harry E. Hull
| | Republican
| 1914
| Incumbent re-elected.
| nowrap | 

|-
! 
| Burton E. Sweet
| | Republican
| 1914
| | Incumbent retired to run for U.S. senator.New member elected.Republican hold.
| nowrap | 

|-
! 
| Gilbert N. Haugen
| | Republican
| 1898
| Incumbent re-elected.
| nowrap | 

|-
! 
| Cyrenus Cole
| | Republican
| 1921 
| Incumbent re-elected.
| nowrap | 

|-
! 
| C. William Ramseyer
| | Republican
| 1914
| Incumbent re-elected.
| nowrap | 

|-
! 
| Cassius C. Dowell
| | Republican
| 1914
| Incumbent re-elected.
| nowrap | 

|-
! 
| Horace M. Towner
| | Republican
| 1910
| Incumbent re-elected.
| nowrap | 

|-
! 
| William R. Green
| | Republican
| 1910
| Incumbent re-elected.
| nowrap | 

|-
! 
| Lester J. Dickinson
| | Republican
| 1918
| Incumbent re-elected.
| nowrap | 

|-
! 
| William D. Boies
| | Republican
| 1918
| Incumbent re-elected.
| nowrap | 

|}

Kansas

|-
! 
| Daniel R. Anthony Jr.
| | Republican
| 1907 
| Incumbent re-elected.
| nowrap | 

|-
! 
| Edward C. Little
| | Republican
| 1916
| Incumbent re-elected.
| nowrap | 

|-
! 
| Philip P. Campbell
| | Republican
| 1902
| | Incumbent lost renomination.New member elected.Republican hold.
| nowrap | 

|-
! 
| Homer Hoch
| | Republican
| 1918
| Incumbent re-elected.
| nowrap | 

|-
! 
| James G. Strong
| | Republican
| 1918
| Incumbent re-elected.
| nowrap | 

|-
! 
| Hays B. White
| | Republican
| 1918
| Incumbent re-elected.
| nowrap | 

|-
! 
| Jasper Napoleon Tincher
| | Republican
| 1918
| Incumbent re-elected.
| nowrap | 

|-
! 
| Richard E. Bird
| | Republican
| 1920
| | Incumbent lost re-election.New member elected.Democratic gain.
| nowrap | 

|}

Kentucky

|-
! 
| Alben Barkley
| | Democratic
| 1912
| Incumbent re-elected.
| nowrap | 

|-
! 
| David Hayes Kincheloe
| | Democratic
| 1914
| Incumbent re-elected.
| nowrap | 

|-
! 
| Robert Y. Thomas Jr.
| | Democratic
| 1908
| Incumbent re-elected.
| nowrap | 

|-
! 
| Ben Johnson
| | Democratic
| 1906
| Incumbent re-elected.
| nowrap | 

|-
! 
| Charles F. Ogden
| | Republican
| 1918
| | Incumbent retired.New member elected.Republican hold.
| nowrap | 

|-
! 
| Arthur B. Rouse
| | Democratic
| 1910
| Incumbent re-elected.
| nowrap | 

|-
! 
| J. Campbell Cantrill
| | Democratic
| 1908
| Incumbent re-elected.
| nowrap | 

|-
! 
| Ralph Waldo Emerson Gilbert
| | Democratic
| 1920
| Incumbent re-elected.
| nowrap | 

|-
! 
| William Jason Fields
| | Democratic
| 1910
| Incumbent re-elected.
| nowrap | 

|-
! 
| John W. Langley
| | Republican
| 1906
| Incumbent re-elected.
| nowrap | 

|-
! 
| John M. Robsion
| | Republican
| 1918
| Incumbent re-elected.
| nowrap | 

|}

Louisiana

|-
! 
| James O'Connor
| | Democratic
| 1918
| Incumbent re-elected.
| nowrap | 

|-
! 
| Henry Garland Dupré
| | Democratic
| 1908
| Incumbent re-elected.
| nowrap | 

|-
! 
| Whitmell P. Martin
| | Democratic
| 1914
| Incumbent re-elected.
| nowrap | 

|-
! 
| John N. Sandlin
| | Democratic
| 1920
| Incumbent re-elected.
| nowrap | 

|-
! 
| Riley Joseph Wilson
| | Democratic
| 1914
| Incumbent re-elected.
| nowrap | 

|-
! 
| George K. Favrot
| | Democratic
| 1920
| Incumbent re-elected.
| nowrap | 

|-
! 
| Ladislas Lazaro
| | Democratic
| 1912
| Incumbent re-elected.
| nowrap | 

|-
! 
| James Benjamin Aswell
| | Democratic
| 1912
| Incumbent re-elected.
| nowrap | 

|}

Maine

|-
! 
| Carroll L. Beedy
| | Republican
| 1920
| Incumbent re-elected.
| nowrap | 

|-
! 
| Wallace H. White Jr.
| | Republican
| 1916
| Incumbent re-elected.
| nowrap | 

|-
! 
| John E. Nelson
| | Republican
| 1922
| Incumbent re-elected.
| nowrap | 

|-
! 
| Ira G. Hersey
| | Republican
| 1916
| Incumbent re-elected.
| nowrap | 

|}

Maryland

|-
! 
| T. Alan Goldsborough
| | Democratic
| 1920
| Incumbent re-elected.
| nowrap | 

|-
! 
| Albert A. Blakeney
| | Republican
| 1920
| | Incumbent lost re-election.New member elected.Democratic gain.
| nowrap | 

|-
! 
| John P. Hill
| | Republican
| 1920
| Incumbent re-elected.
| nowrap | 

|-
! 
| J. Charles Linthicum
| | Democratic
| 1910
| Incumbent re-elected.
| nowrap | 

|-
! 
| Sydney Emanuel Mudd II
| | Republican
| 1914
| Incumbent re-elected.
| nowrap | 

|-
! 
| Frederick N. Zihlman
| | Republican
| 1916
| Incumbent re-elected.
| nowrap | 

|}

Massachusetts

|-
! 
| Allen T. Treadway
| | Republican
| 1912
| Incumbent re-elected.
| nowrap | 

|-
! 
| Frederick H. Gillett
| | Republican
| 1892
| Incumbent re-elected.
| nowrap | 

|-
! 
| Calvin D. Paige
| | Republican
| 1913 
| Incumbent re-elected.
| nowrap | 

|-
! 
| Samuel E. Winslow
| | Republican
| 1912
| Incumbent re-elected.
| nowrap | 

|-
! 
| John Jacob Rogers
| | Republican
| 1912
| Incumbent re-elected.
| nowrap | 

|-
! 
| Abram Andrew
| | Republican
| 1921 
| Incumbent re-elected.
| nowrap | 

|-
! 
| Robert S. Maloney
| | Republican
| 1920
| | Incumbent retired.New member elected.New member elected.Democratic gain.
| nowrap | 

|-
! 
| Frederick W. Dallinger
| | Republican
| 1914
| Incumbent re-elected.
| nowrap | 

|-
! 
| Charles L. Underhill
| | Republican
| 1920
| Incumbent re-elected.
| nowrap | 

|-
! 
| Peter Francis Tague
| | Democratic
| 19141918 1919 
| Incumbent re-elected.
| nowrap | 

|-
! 
| George H. Tinkham
| | Republican
| 1914
| Incumbent re-elected.
| nowrap | 

|-
! 
| James A. Gallivan
| | Democratic
| 1914
| Incumbent re-elected.
| nowrap | 

|-
! 
| Robert Luce
| | Republican
| 1918
| Incumbent re-elected.
| nowrap | 

|-
! 
| Louis A. Frothingham
| | Republican
| 1920
| Incumbent re-elected.
| nowrap | 

|-
! 
| William S. Greene
| | Republican
| 1898
| Incumbent re-elected.
| nowrap | 

|-
! 
| Joseph Walsh
| | Republican
| 1914
| | Incumbent resigned to become Justice of the Massachusetts Superior Court.New member elected.Republican hold.Winner was also elected to finish the term, see above.
| nowrap | 

|}

Michigan

|-
! 
| George P. Codd
| | Republican
| 1920
| | Incumbent retired.New member elected.Democratic gain.
| nowrap | 

|-
! 
| Earl C. Michener
| | Republican
| 1918
| Incumbent re-elected.
| nowrap | 

|-
! 
| John M. C. Smith
| | Republican
| 1921 
| Incumbent re-elected.
| nowrap | 

|-
! 
| John C. Ketcham
| | Republican
| 1920
| Incumbent re-elected.
| nowrap | 

|-
! 
| Carl E. Mapes
| | Republican
| 1912
| Incumbent re-elected.
| nowrap | 

|-
! 
| Patrick H. Kelley
| | Republican
| 1914
| | Incumbent retired to run for U.S. senator.New member elected.Republican hold.
| nowrap | 

|-
! 
| Louis C. Cramton
| | Republican
| 1912
| Incumbent re-elected.
| nowrap | 

|-
! 
| Joseph W. Fordney
| | Republican
| 1898
| | Incumbent retired.New member elected.Republican hold.
| nowrap | 

|-
! 
| James C. McLaughlin
| | Republican
| 1906
| Incumbent re-elected.
| nowrap | 

|-
! 
| Roy O. Woodruff
| | Republican
| 1920
| Incumbent re-elected.
| nowrap | 

|-
! 
| Frank D. Scott
| | Republican
| 1914
| Incumbent re-elected.
| nowrap | 

|-
! 
| W. Frank James
| | Republican
| 1914
| Incumbent re-elected.
| nowrap | 

|-
! 
| Vincent M. Brennan
| | Republican
| 1920
| | Incumbent retired.New member elected.Republican hold.
| nowrap | 

|}

Minnesota

|-
! 
| Sydney Anderson
| | Republican
| 1910
| Incumbent re-elected.
| nowrap | 

|-
! 
| Frank Clague
| | Republican
| 1920
| Incumbent re-elected.
| nowrap | 

|-
! 
| Charles Russell Davis
| | Republican
| 1902
| Incumbent re-elected.
| nowrap | 

|-
! 
| Oscar Keller
| | Republican
| 1918
| Incumbent re-elected.
| nowrap | 

|-
! 
| Walter Newton
| | Republican
| 1918
| Incumbent re-elected.
| nowrap | 

|-
! 
| Harold Knutson
| | Republican
| 1916
| Incumbent re-elected.
| nowrap | 

|-
! 
| Andrew J. Volstead
| | Republican
| 1902
| | Incumbent lost re-election.New member elected.Farmer–Labor gain.
| nowrap | 

|-
! 
| Oscar J. Larson
| | Republican
| 1918
| Incumbent re-elected.
| nowrap | 

|-
! 
| Halvor Steenerson
| | Republican
| 1902
| | Incumbent lost re-election.New member elected.Farmer–Labor gain.
| nowrap | 

|-
! 
| Thomas D. Schall
| | Republican
| 1914
| Incumbent re-elected.
| nowrap | 

|}

Mississippi

|-
! 
| John E. Rankin
| | Democratic
| 1920
| Incumbent re-elected.
| nowrap | 

|-
! 
| Bill G. Lowrey
| | Democratic
| 1920
| Incumbent re-elected.
| nowrap | 

|-
! 
| Benjamin G. Humphreys II
| | Democratic
| 1902
| Incumbent re-elected.
| nowrap | 

|-
! 
| Thomas U. Sisson
| | Democratic
| 1908
| | Incumbent lost renomination.New member elected.Democratic hold.
| nowrap | 

|-
! 
| Ross A. Collins
| | Democratic
| 1920
| Incumbent re-elected.
| nowrap | 

|-
! 
| Paul B. Johnson Sr.
| | Democratic
| 1918
| | Incumbent retired.New member elected.Democratic hold.
| nowrap | 

|-
! 
| Percy E. Quin
| | Democratic
| 1912
| Incumbent re-elected.
| nowrap | 

|-
! 
| James W. Collier
| | Democratic
| 1908
| Incumbent re-elected.
| nowrap | 

|}

Missouri

|-
! 
| Frank C. Millspaugh
| | Republican
| 1920
| | Incumbent lost re-election.New member elected.Democratic gain.
| nowrap | 

|-
! 
| William W. Rucker
| | Democratic
| 1898
| | Incumbent lost renomination.New member elected.Democratic hold.
| nowrap | 

|-
! 
| Henry F. Lawrence
| | Republican
| 1920
| | Incumbent lost re-election.New member elected.Democratic gain.
| nowrap | 

|-
! 
| Charles L. Faust
| | Republican
| 1920
| Incumbent re-elected.
| nowrap | 

|-
! 
| Edgar C. Ellis
| | Republican
| 1920
| | Incumbent lost re-election.New member elected.Democratic gain.
| nowrap | 

|-
! 
| William O. Atkeson
| | Republican
| 1920
| | Incumbent lost re-election.New member elected.Democratic gain.
| nowrap | 

|-
! 
| Roscoe C. Patterson
| | Republican
| 1920
| | Incumbent lost re-election.New member elected.Democratic gain.
| nowrap | 

|-
! 
| Sidney C. Roach
| | Republican
| 1920
| Incumbent re-elected.
| nowrap | 

|-
! 
| Theodore W. Hukriede
| | Republican
| 1920
| | Incumbent lost re-election.New member elected.Democratic gain.
| nowrap | 

|-
! 
| Cleveland A. Newton
| | Republican
| 1918
| Incumbent re-elected.
| nowrap | 

|-
! 
| Harry B. Hawes
| | Democratic
| 1920
| Incumbent re-elected.
| nowrap | 

|-
! 
| Leonidas C. Dyer
| | Republican
| 1914
| Incumbent re-elected.
| nowrap | 

|-
! 
| Marion E. Rhodes
| | Republican
| 1918
| | Incumbent lost re-election.New member elected.Democratic gain.
| nowrap | 

|-
! 
| Edward D. Hays
| | Republican
| 1918
| | Incumbent lost re-election.New member elected.Democratic gain.
| nowrap | 

|-
! 
| Isaac V. McPherson
| | Republican
| 1918
| | Incumbent lost renomination.New member elected.Republican hold.
| nowrap | 

|-
! 
| Samuel A. Shelton
| | Republican
| 1920
| | Incumbent retired.New member elected.Democratic gain.
| nowrap | 

|}

Montana

|-
! 
| Washington J. McCormick
| | Republican
| 1920
| | Incumbent lost re-election.New member elected.Democratic gain.
| nowrap | 

|-
! 
| Carl W. Riddick
| | Republican
| 1918
| | Incumbent retired to run for U.S. senator.New member elected.Republican hold.
| nowrap | 

|}

Nebraska

|-
! 
| C. Frank Reavis
| | Republican
| 1914
| | Incumbent resigned.New member elected.Democratic gain.
| nowrap | 

|-
! 
| Albert W. Jefferis
| | Republican
| 1918
| | Incumbent retired to run for U.S. senator.New member elected.Republican hold.
| nowrap | 

|-
! 
| Robert E. Evans
| | Republican
| 1918
| | Incumbent lost re-election.New member elected.Democratic gain.
| nowrap | 

|-
! 
| Melvin O. McLaughlin
| | Republican
| 1918
| Incumbent re-elected.
| nowrap | 

|-
! 
| William E. Andrews
| | Republican
| 1918
| | Incumbent lost re-election.New member elected.Democratic gain.
| nowrap | 

|-
! 
| Moses P. Kinkaid
| | Republican
| 1902
| | Incumbent died.New member elected.Republican hold.
| nowrap | 

|}

Nevada

|-
! 
| Samuel S. Arentz
| | Republican
| 1920
| | Incumbent retired to run for U.S. senator.New member elected.Democratic gain.
| nowrap | 

|}

New Hampshire

|-
! 
| Sherman Everett Burroughs
| | Republican
| 1916
| | Incumbent retired.New member elected.Democratic gain.
| nowrap | 

|-
! 
| Edward Hills Wason
| | Republican
| 1914
| Incumbent re-elected.
| nowrap | 

|}

New Jersey

|-
! 
| Francis F. Patterson Jr.
| | Republican
| 1920
| Incumbent re-elected.
| nowrap | 

|-
! 
| Isaac Bacharach
| | Republican
| 1914
| Incumbent re-elected.
| nowrap | 

|-
! 
| T. Frank Appleby
| | Republican
| 1920
| | Incumbent lost re-election.New member elected.Democratic gain.
| nowrap | 

|-
! 
| Elijah C. Hutchinson
| | Republican
| 1914
| | Incumbent lost re-election.New member elected.Democratic gain.
| nowrap | 

|-
! 
| Ernest R. Ackerman
| | Republican
| 1918
| Incumbent re-elected.
| nowrap | 

|-
! 
| Randolph Perkins
| | Republican
| 1920
| Incumbent re-elected.
| nowrap | 

|-
! 
| Amos H. Radcliffe
| | Republican
| 1918
| | Incumbent lost renomination.New member elected.Republican hold.
| nowrap | 

|-
! 
| Herbert W. Taylor
| | Republican
| 1920
| | Incumbent lost renomination.New member elected.Democratic gain.
| nowrap | 

|-
! 
| Richard W. Parker
| | Republican
| 1920
| | Incumbent lost re-election.New member elected.Democratic gain.
| nowrap | 

|-
! 
| Frederick R. Lehlbach
| | Republican
| 1914
| Incumbent re-elected.
| nowrap | 

|-
! 
| Archibald E. Olpp
| | Republican
| 1920
| | Incumbent lost re-election.New member elected.Democratic gain.
| nowrap | 

|-
! 
| Charles F. X. O'Brien
| | Democratic
| 1920
| Incumbent re-elected.
| nowrap | 

|}

New Mexico

|-
! 
| Nestor Montoya
| | Republican
| 1920
| | Incumbent died.New member elected.Democratic gain.
| nowrap | 

|}

New York

|-
! 
| Frederick C. Hicks
| | Republican
| 1914
| | Incumbent retired.New member elected.Republican hold.
| nowrap | 

|-
! 
| John J. Kindred
| | Democratic
| 1920
| Incumbent re-elected.
| nowrap | 

|-
! 
| John Kissel
| | Republican
| 1920
| | Incumbent lost re-election.New member elected.Democratic gain.
| nowrap | 

|-
! 
| Thomas H. Cullen
| | Democratic
| 1918
| Incumbent re-elected.
| nowrap | 

|-
! 
| Ardolph L. Kline
| | Republican
| 1920
| | Incumbent lost re-election.New member elected.Democratic gain.
| nowrap | 

|-
! 
| Warren I. Lee
| | Republican
| 1920
| | Incumbent lost re-election.New member elected.Democratic gain.
| nowrap | 

|-
! 
| Michael J. Hogan
| | Republican
| 1920
| | Incumbent lost re-election.New member elected.Democratic gain.
| nowrap | 

|-
! 
| Charles G. Bond
| | Republican
| 1920
| | Incumbent lost re-election.New member elected.Democratic gain.
| nowrap | 

|-
! 
| Andrew Petersen
| | Republican
| 1920
| | Incumbent lost re-election.New member elected.Democratic gain.
| nowrap | 

|-
! 
| Lester D. Volk
| | Republican
| 1920
| | Incumbent lost re-election.New member elected.Democratic gain.
| nowrap | 

|-
! 
| Daniel J. Riordan
| | Democratic
| 1906
| Incumbent re-elected.
| nowrap | 

|-
! 
| Meyer London
| | Socialist
| 1920
| | Incumbent lost re-election.New member elected.Democratic gain.
| nowrap | 

|-
! 
| Christopher D. Sullivan
| | Democratic
| 1916
| Incumbent re-elected.
| nowrap | 

|-
! 
| Nathan D. Perlman
| | Republican
| 1920
| Incumbent re-elected.
| nowrap | 

|-
! 
| Thomas J. Ryan
| | Republican
| 1920
| | Incumbent lost re-election.New member elected.Democratic gain.
| nowrap | 

|-
! 
| W. Bourke Cockran
| | Democratic
| 1920
| Incumbent re-elected.
| nowrap | 

|-
! 
| Ogden L. Mills
| | Republican
| 1920
| Incumbent re-elected.
| nowrap | 

|-
! 
| John F. Carew
| | Democratic
| 1912
| Incumbent re-elected.
| nowrap | 

|-
! 
| Walter M. Chandler
| | Republican
| 1920
| | Incumbent lost re-election.New member elected.Democratic gain.
| nowrap | 

|-
! 
| Isaac Siegel
| | Republican
| 1914
| | Incumbent retired.New member elected.Republican hold.
| nowrap | 

|-
! 
| Martin C. Ansorge
| | Republican
| 1920
| | Incumbent lost re-election.New member elected.Democratic gain.
| nowrap | 

|-
! 
| Anthony J. Griffin
| | Democratic
| 1918
| Incumbent re-elected.
| nowrap | 

|-
! 
| Albert B. Rossdale
| | Republican
| 1920
| | Incumbent lost re-election.New member elected.Democratic gain.
| nowrap | 

|-
! 
| Benjamin L. Fairchild
| | Republican
| 1920
| | Incumbent lost re-election.New member elected.Democratic gain.
| nowrap | 

|-
! 
| James W. Husted
| | Republican
| 1914
| | Incumbent retired.New member elected.Republican hold.
| nowrap | 

|-
! 
| Hamilton Fish Jr.
| | Republican
| 1920
| Incumbent re-elected.
| nowrap | 

|-
! 
| Charles B. Ward
| | Republican
| 1914
| Incumbent re-elected.
| nowrap | 

|-
! 
| Peter G. Ten Eyck
| | Democratic
| 1920
| | Incumbent retired.New member elected.Democratic hold.
| nowrap | 

|-
! 
| James S. Parker
| | Republican
| 1912
| Incumbent re-elected.
| nowrap | 

|-
! 
| Frank Crowther
| | Republican
| 1918
| Incumbent re-elected.
| nowrap | 

|-
! 
| Bertrand Snell
| | Republican
| 1915 
| Incumbent re-elected.
| nowrap | 

|-
! 
| Luther W. Mott
| | Republican
| 1910
| Incumbent re-elected.
| nowrap | 

|-
! 
| Homer P. Snyder
| | Republican
| 1914
| Incumbent re-elected.
| nowrap | 

|-
! 
| John D. Clarke
| | Republican
| 1920
| Incumbent re-elected.
| nowrap | 

|-
! 
| Walter W. Magee
| | Republican
| 1914
| Incumbent re-elected.
| nowrap | 

|-
! 
| Norman J. Gould
| | Republican
| 1915 
| | Incumbent retired.New member elected.Republican hold.
| nowrap | 

|-
! 
| Lewis Henry
| | Republican
| 1922 
|  | Incumbent lost renomination.New member elected.Republican hold.
| nowrap | 

|-
! 
| Thomas B. Dunn
| | Republican
| 1912
| | Incumbent retired.New member elected.Democratic gain.
| nowrap | 

|-
! 
| Archie D. Sanders
| | Republican
| 1916
| Incumbent re-elected.
| nowrap | 

|-
! 
| S. Wallace Dempsey
| | Republican
| 1914
| Incumbent re-elected.
| nowrap | 

|-
! 
| Clarence MacGregor
| | Republican
| 1918
| Incumbent re-elected.
| nowrap | 

|-
! 
| James M. Mead
| | Democratic
| 1918
| Incumbent re-elected.
| nowrap | 

|-
! 
| Daniel A. Reed
| | Republican
| 1918
| Incumbent re-elected.
| nowrap | 

|}

North Carolina

|-
! 
| Hallett Sydney Ward
| | Democratic
| 1920
| Incumbent re-elected.
| nowrap | 

|-
! 
| Claude Kitchin
| | Democratic
| 1900
| Incumbent re-elected.
| nowrap | 

|-
! 
| Samuel M. Brinson
| | Democratic
| 1918
| | Incumbent died.New member elected.Democratic hold.
| nowrap | 

|-
! 
| Edward W. Pou
| | Democratic
| 1900
| Incumbent re-elected.
| nowrap | 

|-
! 
| Charles Manly Stedman
| | Democratic
| 1910
| Incumbent re-elected.
| nowrap | 

|-
! 
| Homer L. Lyon
| | Democratic
| 1920
| Incumbent re-elected.
| nowrap | 

|-
! 
| William C. Hammer
| | Democratic
| 1920
| Incumbent re-elected.
| nowrap | 

|-
! 
| Robert L. Doughton
| | Democratic
| 1910
| Incumbent re-elected.
| nowrap | 

|-
! 
| Alfred L. Bulwinkle
| | Democratic
| 1920
| Incumbent re-elected.
| nowrap | 

|-
! 
| Zebulon Weaver
| | Democratic
| 1916
| Incumbent re-elected.
| nowrap | 

|}

North Dakota

|-
! 
| Olger B. Burtness
| | Republican
| 1920
| Incumbent re-elected.
| nowrap | 

|-
! 
| George M. Young
| | Republican
| 1912
| Incumbent re-elected.
| nowrap | 

|-
! 
| James H. Sinclair
| | Republican
| 1918
| Incumbent re-elected.
| nowrap | 

|}

Ohio

|-
! 
| Nicholas Longworth
| | Republican
| 1914
| Incumbent re-elected.
| nowrap | 

|-
! 
| Ambrose E. B. Stephens
| | Republican
| 1918
| Incumbent re-elected.
| nowrap | 

|-
! 
| Roy G. Fitzgerald
| | Republican
| 1920
| Incumbent re-elected.
| nowrap | 

|-
! 
| John L. Cable
| | Republican
| 1920
| Incumbent re-elected.
| nowrap | 

|-
! 
| Charles J. Thompson
| | Republican
| 1918
| Incumbent re-elected.
| nowrap | 

|-
! 
| Charles C. Kearns
| | Republican
| 1914
| Incumbent re-elected.
| nowrap | 

|-
! 
| Simeon D. Fess
| | Republican
| 1914
| | Incumbent retired to run for U.S. senator.New member elected.Republican hold.
| nowrap | 

|-
! 
| R. Clint Cole
| | Republican
| 1918
| Incumbent re-elected.
| nowrap | 

|-
! 
| William W. Chalmers
| | Republican
| 1920
| | Incumbent lost re-election.New member elected.Democratic gain.
| nowrap | 

|-
! 
| Israel M. Foster
| | Republican
| 1918
| Incumbent re-elected.
| nowrap | 

|-
! 
| Edwin D. Ricketts
| | Republican
| 1918
| | Incumbent lost re-election.New member elected.Democratic gain.
| nowrap | 

|-
! 
| John C. Speaks
| | Republican
| 1920
| Incumbent re-elected.
| nowrap | 

|-
! 
| James T. Begg
| | Republican
| 1918
| Incumbent re-elected.
| nowrap | 

|-
! 
| Charles L. Knight
| | Republican
| 1920
| | Incumbent retired to run for GovernorNew member elected.Democratic gain.
| nowrap | 

|-
! 
| C. Ellis Moore
| | Republican
| 1918
| Incumbent re-elected.
| nowrap | 

|-
! 
| Joseph H. Himes
| | Republican
| 1920
| | Incumbent lost re-election.New member elected.Democratic gain.
| nowrap | 

|-
! 
| William M. Morgan
| | Republican
| 1920
| Incumbent re-elected.
| nowrap | 

|-
! 
| B. Frank Murphy
| | Republican
| 1918
| Incumbent re-elected.
| nowrap | 

|-
! 
| John G. Cooper
| | Republican
| 1914
| Incumbent re-elected.
| nowrap | 

|-
! 
| Miner G. Norton
| | Republican
| 1920
| | Incumbent lost re-election.New member elected.Democratic gain.
| nowrap | 

|-
! 
| Harry C. Gahn
| | Republican
| 1920
| | Incumbent lost re-election.New member elected.Democratic gain.
| nowrap | 

|-
! 
| Theodore E. Burton
| | Republican
| 1920
| Incumbent re-elected.
| nowrap | 

|}

Oklahoma

|-
! 
| Thomas Alberter Chandler
| | Republican
| 1920
| | Incumbent lost re-election.New member elected.Democratic gain.
| nowrap | 

|-
! 
| Alice M. Robertson
| | Republican
| 1920
| | Incumbent lost re-election.New member elected.Democratic gain.
| nowrap | 

|-
! 
| Charles D. Carter
| | Democratic
| 1907 
| Incumbent re-elected.
| nowrap | 

|-
! 
| Joseph C. Pringey
| | Republican
| 1920
| | Incumbent lost re-election.New member elected.Democratic gain.
| nowrap | 

|-
! 
| Fletcher B. Swank
| | Democratic
| 1920
| Incumbent re-elected.
| nowrap | 

|-
! 
| L. M. Gensman
| | Republican
| 1920
| | Incumbent lost re-election.New member elected.Democratic gain.
| nowrap | 

|-
! 
| James V. McClintic
| | Democratic
| 1914
| Incumbent re-elected.
| nowrap | 

|-
! 
| Manuel Herrick
| | Republican
| 1920
| | Incumbent lost renomination.New member elected.Republican hold.
| nowrap | 

|}

Oregon

|-
! 
| Willis C. Hawley
| | Republican
| 1906
| Incumbent re-elected.
| nowrap | 

|-
! 
| Nicholas J. Sinnott
| | Republican
| 1912
| Incumbent re-elected.
| nowrap | 

|-
! 
| Clifton N. McArthur
| | Republican
| 1914
| | Incumbent lost re-election.New member elected.Democratic gain.
| nowrap | 

|}

Pennsylvania

Pennsylvania was one of the only states to conduct redistricting between 1920 and 1922, when no nationwide reapportionment occurred. Incumbents have been shown in the most closely corresponding new districts. The four districts shown as new below replaced the four at-large seats used previously; since the at-large seats were all Republican held, the new districts are only nominally Republican gains.

|-
! 
| William S. Vare
| | Republican
| 1912
| Incumbent re-elected.
| nowrap | 

|-
! 
| George S. Graham
| | Republican
| 1912
| Incumbent re-elected.
| nowrap | 

|-
! 
| Harry C. Ransley
| | Republican
| 1920
| Incumbent re-elected.
| nowrap | 

|-
! 
| George W. Edmonds
| | Republican
| 1912
| Incumbent re-elected.
| nowrap | 

|-
! 
| James J. Connolly
| | Republican
| 1920
| Incumbent re-elected.
| nowrap | 

|-
! 
| colspan=3 | None (district created)
| | Republican gain.
| nowrap | 

|-
! 
| George P. Darrow
| | Republican
| 1914
| Incumbent re-elected.
| nowrap | 

|-
! 
| Thomas S. Butler
| | Republican
| 1896
| Incumbent re-elected.
| nowrap | 

|-
! 
| Henry Winfield Watson
| | Republican
| 1914
| Incumbent re-elected.
| nowrap | 

|-
! 
| William Walton Griest
| | Republican
| 1908
| Incumbent re-elected.
| nowrap | 

|-
! 
| Charles Robert Connell
| | Republican
| 1920
| | Incumbent died.New member elected.Republican hold.
| nowrap | 

|-
! 
| Clarence Dennis Coughlin
| | Republican
| 1920
| | Incumbent lost re-election.New member elected.Democratic gain.
| nowrap | 

|-
! 
| John Reber
| | Republican
| 1918
| | Incumbent retired.New member elected.Republican hold.
| nowrap | 

|-
! 
| Fred B. Gernerd
| | Republican
| 1920
| | Incumbent lost re-election.New member elected.Democratic gain.
| nowrap | 

|-
! 
| Louis T. McFadden
| | Republican
| 1914
| Incumbent re-elected.
| nowrap | 

|-
! 
| Edgar R. Kiess
| | Republican
| 1912
| Incumbent re-elected.
| nowrap | 

|-
! 
| I. Clinton Kline
| | Republican
| 1920
| | Incumbent lost re-election.New member elected.Democratic gain.
| nowrap | 

|-
! 
| Benjamin K. Focht
| | Republican
| 1914
| | Incumbent lost renomination.New member elected.Republican hold.
| nowrap | 

|-
! 
| Aaron Shenk Kreider
| | Republican
| 1912
| | Incumbent lost re-election.New member elected.Democratic gain.
| nowrap | 

|-
! 
| John M. Rose
| | Republican
| 1916
| | Incumbent retired.New member elected.Republican hold.
| nowrap | 

|-
! 
| Evan J. Jones
| | Republican
| 1918
| | Incumbent lost renomination.New member elected.Republican hold.
| nowrap | 

|-
! 
| Edward S. Brooks
| | Republican
| 1918
| | Incumbent retired.New member elected.Democratic gain.
| nowrap | 

|-
! 
| colspan=3 | None (district created)
| | Republican gain.
| nowrap | 

|-
! 
| Samuel Austin Kendall
| | Republican
| 1918
| Incumbent re-elected.
| nowrap | 

|-
! 
| Henry Wilson Temple
| | Republican
| 1912
| Incumbent re-elected.
| nowrap | 

|-
! 
| colspan=3 | None (district created)
| | Republican gain.
| nowrap | 

|-
! 
| Nathan Leroy Strong
| | Republican
| 1916
| Incumbent re-elected.
| nowrap | 

|-
! 
| Harris J. Bixler
| | Republican
| 1920
| Incumbent re-elected.
| nowrap | 

|-
! 
| Milton W. Shreve
| | IndependentRepublican
| 1918
| | Incumbent re-elected as a Republican.Republican gain.
| nowrap | 

|-
! 
| William H. Kirkpatrick
| | Republican
| 1920
| | Incumbent lost re-election.New member elected.Democratic gain.
| nowrap | 

|-
! 
| Adam M. Wyant
| | Republican
| 1920
| Incumbent re-elected.
| nowrap | 

|-
! 
| Stephen Geyer Porter
| | Republican
| 1910
| Incumbent re-elected.
| nowrap | 

|-
! 
| Melville Clyde Kelly
| | Republican
| 1916
| Incumbent re-elected.
| nowrap | 

|-
! 
| John M. Morin
| | Republican
| 1912
| Incumbent re-elected.
| nowrap | 

|-
! 
| colspan=3 | None (district created)
| | Republican gain.
| nowrap | 

|-
! 
| Guy E. Campbell
| | Democratic
| 1916
| | Incumbent re-elected as a Republican.New member elected.Republican gain.
| nowrap | 

|-
| rowspan=4 | 
| William J. Burke
|  | Republican
| 1918
|  | Incumbent retired.New member elected.Republican loss.

|-
| Joseph McLaughlin
|  | Republican
| 1920
|  | Incumbent retired.New member elected.Republican loss.

|-
| Anderson Howell Walters
|  | Republican
| 1918
|  | Incumbent retired.New member elected.Republican loss.

|-
| Thomas S. Crago
|  | Republican
| 1921
|  | Incumbent retired.New member elected.Republican loss.

|}

Rhode Island

|-
! 
| Clark Burdick
| | Republican
| 1918
| Incumbent re-elected.
| nowrap | 

|-
! 
| Walter R. Stiness
| | Republican
| 1914
| | Incumbent retired.New member elected.Republican hold.
| nowrap | 

|-
! 
| Ambrose Kennedy
| | Republican
| 1912
| | Incumbent retired.New member elected.Democratic gain.
| nowrap | 

|}

South Carolina

|-
! 
| W. Turner Logan
| | Democratic
| 1920
| Incumbent re-elected.
| nowrap | 

|-
! 
| James F. Byrnes
| | Democratic
| 1910
| Incumbent re-elected.
| nowrap | 

|-
! 
| Frederick H. Dominick
| | Democratic
| 1916
| Incumbent re-elected.
| nowrap | 

|-
! 
| John J. McSwain
| | Democratic
| 1920
| Incumbent re-elected.
| nowrap | 

|-
! 
| William F. Stevenson
| | Democratic
| 1917 
| Incumbent re-elected.
| nowrap | 

|-
! 
| Philip H. Stoll
| | Democratic
| 1919 
| | Incumbent lost renomination.New member elected.Democratic hold.
| nowrap | 

|-
! 
| Hampton P. Fulmer
| | Democratic
| 1920
| Incumbent re-elected.
| nowrap | 

|}

South Dakota

|-
! 
| Charles A. Christopherson
| | Republican
| 1918
| Incumbent re-elected.
| nowrap | 

|-
! 
| Royal C. Johnson
| | Republican
| 1918
| Incumbent re-elected.
| nowrap | 

|-
! 
| William Williamson
| | Republican
| 1920
| Incumbent re-elected.
| nowrap | 

|}

Tennessee

|-
! 
| B. Carroll Reece
| | Republican
| 1920
| Incumbent re-elected.
| nowrap | 

|-
! 
| J. Will Taylor
| | Republican
| 1918
| Incumbent re-elected.
| nowrap | 

|-
! 
| Joseph Edgar Brown
| | Republican
| 1920
| | Incumbent retired.New member elected.Democratic gain.
| nowrap | 

|-
! 
| Wynne F. Clouse
| | Republican
| 1920
| | Incumbent lost re-election.New member elected.Democratic gain.
| nowrap | 

|-
! 
| Ewin L. Davis
| | Democratic
| 1918
| Incumbent re-elected.
| nowrap | 

|-
! 
| Joseph W. Byrns Sr.
| | Democratic
| 1908
| Incumbent re-elected.
| nowrap | 

|-
! 
| Lemuel P. Padgett
| | Democratic
| 1900
| | Incumbent died.New member elected.Democratic hold.
| nowrap | 

|-
! 
| Lon A. Scott
| | Republican
| 1920
| | Incumbent lost re-election.New member elected.Democratic gain.
| nowrap | 

|-
! 
| Finis J. Garrett
| | Democratic
| 1904
| Incumbent re-elected.
| nowrap | 

|-
! 
| Hubert Fisher
| | Democratic
| 1916
| Incumbent re-elected.
| nowrap | 

|}

Texas

|-
! 
| Eugene Black
| | Democratic
| 1914
| Incumbent re-elected.
| nowrap | 

|-
! 
| John C. Box
| | Democratic
| 1918
| Incumbent re-elected.
| nowrap | 

|-
! 
| Morgan G. Sanders
| | Democratic
| 1920
| Incumbent re-elected.
| nowrap | 

|-
! 
| Sam Rayburn
| | Democratic
| 1912
| Incumbent re-elected.
| nowrap | 

|-
! 
| Hatton W. Sumners
| | Democratic
| 1914
| Incumbent re-elected.
| nowrap | 

|-
! 
| Rufus Hardy
| | Democratic
| 1906
| | Incumbent retired.New member elected.Democratic hold.
| nowrap | 

|-
! 
| Clay Stone Briggs
| | Democratic
| 1918
| Incumbent re-elected.
| nowrap | 

|-
! 
| Daniel E. Garrett
| | Democratic
| 1920
| Incumbent re-elected.
| nowrap | 

|-
! 
| Joseph J. Mansfield
| | Democratic
| 1916
| Incumbent re-elected.
| nowrap | 

|-
! 
| James P. Buchanan
| | Democratic
| 1912
| Incumbent re-elected.
| nowrap | 

|-
! 
| Tom Connally
| | Democratic
| 1916
| Incumbent re-elected.
| nowrap | 

|-
! 
| Fritz G. Lanham
| | Democratic
| 1919 
| Incumbent re-elected.
| nowrap | 

|-
! 
| Guinn Williams
| | Democratic
| 1922
| Incumbent re-elected.
| nowrap | 

|-
! 
| Harry M. Wurzbach
| | Republican
| 1920
| Incumbent re-elected.
| nowrap | 

|-
! 
| John Nance Garner
| | Democratic
| 1902
| Incumbent re-elected.
| nowrap | 

|-
! 
| Claude Benton Hudspeth
| | Democratic
| 1918
| Incumbent re-elected.
| nowrap | 

|-
! 
| Thomas L. Blanton
| | Democratic
| 1916
| Incumbent re-elected.
| nowrap | 

|-
! 
| John Marvin Jones
| | Democratic
| 1916
| Incumbent re-elected.
| nowrap | 

|}

Utah

|-
! 
| Don B. Colton
| | Republican
| 1920
| Incumbent re-elected.
| nowrap | 

|-
! 
| Elmer O. Leatherwood
| | Republican
| 1920
| Incumbent re-elected.
| nowrap | 

|}

Vermont

|-
! 
| Frank L. Greene
| | Republican
| 1910
| | Incumbent retired to run for U.S. senator.New member elected.Republican hold.
| nowrap | 

|-
! 
| Porter H. Dale
| | Republican
| 1914
| Incumbent re-elected.
| nowrap | 

|}

Virginia 

|-
! 
| S. Otis Bland
| | Democratic
| 1918
| Incumbent re-elected.
| nowrap | 

|-
! 
| Joseph T. Deal
| | Democratic
| 1920
| Incumbent re-elected.
| nowrap | 

|-
! 
| Andrew Jackson Montague
| | Democratic
| 1912
| Incumbent re-elected.
| nowrap | 

|-
! 
| Patrick H. Drewry
| | Democratic
| 1920
| Incumbent re-elected.
| nowrap | 

|-
! 
| J. Murray Hooker
| | Democratic
| 1921 
| Incumbent re-elected.
| nowrap | 

|-
! 
| James P. Woods
| | Democratic
| 1919 
| | Incumbent lost renomination.New member elected.Democratic hold.
| nowrap | 

|-
! 
| Thomas W. Harrison
| | Democratic
| 1916
| Incumbent re-elected.
| nowrap | 

|-
! 
| R. Walton Moore
| | Democratic
| 1919 
| Incumbent re-elected.
| nowrap | 

|-
! 
| C. Bascom Slemp
| | Republican
| 1907 
| | Incumbent retired.New member elected.Democratic gain.
| nowrap | 

|-
! 
| Henry St. George Tucker III
| | Democratic
| 1922
| Incumbent re-elected.
| nowrap | 

|}

Washington

|-
! 
| John Franklin Miller
| | Republican
| 1916
| Incumbent re-elected.
| nowrap | 

|-
! 
| Lindley H. Hadley
| | Republican
| 1914
| Incumbent re-elected.
| nowrap | 

|-
! 
| Albert Johnson
| | Republican
| 1912
| Incumbent re-elected.
| nowrap | 

|-
! 
| John W. Summers
| | Republican
| 1918
| Incumbent re-elected.
| nowrap | 

|-
! 
| J. Stanley Webster
| | Republican
| 1918
| Incumbent re-elected.
| nowrap | 

|}

West Virginia

|-
! 
| Benjamin L. Rosenbloom
| | Republican
| 1920
| Incumbent re-elected.
| nowrap | 

|-
! 
| George M. Bowers
| | Republican
| 1914
| | Incumbent lost re-election.New member elected.Democratic gain.
| nowrap | 

|-
! 
| Stuart F. Reed
| | Republican
| 1916
| Incumbent re-elected.
| nowrap | 

|-
! 
| Harry C. Woodyard
| | Republican
| 1914
| | Incumbent lost re-election.New member elected.Democratic gain.
| nowrap | 

|-
! 
| Wells Goodykoontz
| | Republican
| 1918
| | Incumbent lost re-election.New member elected.Democratic gain.
| nowrap | 

|-
! 
| Leonard S. Echols
| | Republican
| 1918
| | Incumbent lost re-election.New member elected.Democratic gain.
| nowrap | 

|}

Wisconsin

|-
! 
| Henry A. Cooper
| | Republican
| 1920
| Incumbent re-elected.
| nowrap | 

|-
! 
| Edward Voigt
| | Republican
| 1916
| Incumbent re-elected.
| nowrap | 

|-
! 
| John M. Nelson
| | Republican
| 1920
| Incumbent re-elected.
| nowrap | 

|-
! 
| John C. Kleczka
| | Republican
| 1918
| | Incumbent retired.New member elected.Republican hold.
| nowrap | 

|-
! 
| William H. Stafford
| | Republican
| 1920
| | Incumbent lost re-election.New member elected.Socialist gain.
| nowrap | 

|-
! 
| Florian Lampert
| | Republican
| 1918
| Incumbent re-elected.
| nowrap | 

|-
! 
| Joseph D. Beck
| | Republican
| 1920
| Incumbent re-elected.
| nowrap | 

|-
! 
| Edward E. Browne
| | Republican
| 1912
| Incumbent re-elected.
| nowrap | 

|-
! 
| David Guy Classon
| | Republican
| 1916
| | Incumbent retired.New member elected.Republican hold.
| nowrap | 

|-
! 
| James A. Frear
| | Republican
| 1912
| Incumbent re-elected.
| nowrap | 

|-
! 
| Adolphus Peter Nelson
| | Republican
| 1918
| | Incumbent lost renomination.New member elected.Republican hold.
| nowrap | 

|}

Wyoming

|-
! 
| Franklin Wheeler Mondell
| | Republican
| 1898
| | Incumbent retired to run for U.S. senator.New member elected.Republican hold.
| nowrap | 

|}

Non-voting delegates

Alaska Territory 

|-
! 
| Daniel A. Sutherland
|  | Republican
| 1920
| Incumbent re-elected.
| nowrap | 

|}

Hawaii Territory 

|-
! 
| Henry Alexander Baldwin
|  | Republican
| 1922 
|  | Incumbent retired.New member elected.Democratic gain.
| nowrap | 

|}

See also
 1922 United States elections
 1922 United States Senate elections
1922 United States gubernatorial elections
 67th United States Congress
 68th United States Congress

Notes

References

Sources

Further reading
 Berner,  David. The Politics of Provincialism: The Democratic party in transition, 1918–1932 (1968)
 Ciment, ed., James. Encyclopedia of the Jazz Age: From the end of World War I to the Great Crash (2008)